Red Table Talk is an American talk show starring Jada Pinkett Smith, Willow Smith and Jada's mother, Adrienne Banfield-Norris, that premiered on May 7, 2018 on Facebook Watch. On June 13, 2018, it was announced that Facebook had ordered an additional thirteen episodes of the series. These new episodes premiered on October 22, 2018. The show's second season premiered on May 6, 2019. Facebook Watch renewed the web series for a third and fourth season, released on February 26, 2020 and March 31, 2021, respectively. The series also spawned a spinoff, Red Table Talk: The Estefans, led by Gloria Estefan, Emily Estefan and Lili Estefan. The show was renewed for a fifth season, which premiered on April 20, 2022.

Premise
Red Table Talk provides "a forum where the perspectives of three different generations on a wide variety of topics are shared."

Production
On January 18, 2018, it was announced that Facebook had given the production a series order. The series was expected to star Jada Pinkett Smith, Willow Smith, and Adrienne Banfield-Norris. Pinkett Smith was also set as an executive producer alongside Ellen Rakieten and Miguel Melendez. It was expected the show would premiere in April 2018.

On April 23, 2018, it was announced that the show would premiere on May 7, 2018. On June 13, 2018, it was announced that Facebook had ordered an additional thirteen episodes of the series bringing the first season total up to twenty-three. The additional episodes were expected to premiere in the fall of 2018. Facebook renewed the show for a second season of at least twenty episodes, to premiere in May 2019. Season 2 premiered on May 6, 2019 and is reported to have 20 episodes.

The show launched an overall deal with iHeart Media to launch a podcast radio network.

Episodes

Season 1 (2018–19)

Season 2 (2019)
{{Episode table |background=#000000 |caption=Red Table Talk, season 2 episodes |overall=5 |season=5 |title=34 |aux1=43 |airdate=13 |aux1T=Featured guest |released=y |airdateR= |episodes=

{{Episode list
 |EpisodeNumber   = 37
 |EpisodeNumber2  = 10
 |Title           = Should White People Adopt Black Children
 |Aux1            = Kristin Davis
 |OriginalAirDate = 
 |ShortSummary    = RTT takes on the controversial topic of interracial adoption. Jada and Gammy are joined by Sex and the City'''s Kristin Davis, a mother of two adopted black children, who's been forced to confront her own white privilege after seeing how differently her own kids have been treated.
 |LineColor       = 000000
}}

}}

Season 3 (2020)

Season 4 (2021)

Season 5 (2022)

Reception
Critical response
In a positive review, USA Todays Maeve McDermott praised the series for its "insightful guests, no-holds-barred topics and Smith’s magnetic hosting presence" and favorably compared to other television series saying, "Unlike the web of other celebrity TV shows featuring manufactured family drama and few moments of actual clarity, though, the revealing conversations on Red Table Talk have authentic, difficult lessons at their center." In another encouraging criticism, The Washington Posts Bethonie Butler was equally approving saying, "It's a shrewd business move for the Smiths to acknowledge and address long-standing rumors about their family in a format they can control. That said, there's an authenticity woven throughout the episodes that makes Red Table Talk'' stand out amid a surplus of celebrity-hosted talk shows." The show received a 2019 Daytime Emmy Award nomination in the informative talk-show category.

Viewership
By July 17, 2018, the show's debut episode had been watched 27 million times and episode ten had accumulated 21 million views.

Awards and nominations

References

External links

English-language television shows
Facebook Watch original programming
2018 American television series debuts
Daytime Emmy Award for Outstanding Talk Show winners